Grove Township is a township in Worth County, Iowa, USA.

History
Grove Township was established in 1857. This township was known by the name of Northwood, until 1902 when it was changed to Grove.

References

Townships in Worth County, Iowa
Townships in Iowa
1857 establishments in Iowa
Populated places established in 1857